The Curry County Courthouse in Clovis, New Mexico is a three-and-a-half-story Art Deco-style courthouse which was built in 1936.  It was listed on the National Register of Historic Places in 1987.

It was designed by architect Robert E. Merrell of Schaefer & Merrell architectural firm.  It was expanded in 1954 with a two-story addition, also designed by Robert E. Merrell, over the site of the preceding 1910 courthouse.

Merrell also designed the NRHP-listed Hotel Clovis, at 210 Main St. in Clovis, and the NRHP-listed Roosevelt County Courthouse at 100 W. 2nd St. in Portales, New Mexico.

References

National Register of Historic Places in Curry County, New Mexico
Art Deco architecture in New Mexico
Government buildings completed in 1936
Curry County, New Mexico
Clovis, New Mexico
Courthouses on the National Register of Historic Places in New Mexico